Here I Stand is the fifth studio album by the American singer Usher, released on May 13, 2008, by LaFace Records. Inspired by love for his then-wife—Tameka Foster—and son, Usher recorded many ballads for the album. Prior to the album's recording, Usher split with his mother, Jonnetta Patton, as manager and hired Benny Medina. Usher's estranged father died months before the release of Here I Stand; this also influenced themes of the album. It was originally to be titled Measure of a Man, but Usher named it Here I Stand to mark "a new chapter in life".

Usher promoted Here I Stand by performing on several television shows including Total Request Live, 106 & Park and Good Morning America. Among other concert appearances, he embarked on a One Night Stand: Ladies Only Tour, performing fifteen shows in November 2008. Six singles were released from Here I Stand: "Love in This Club", "Love in This Club Part II", "Moving Mountains", "What's Your Name", "Here I Stand" and "Trading Places". "Love in This Club", which features rapper Young Jeezy, topped the Billboard Hot 100 and New Zealand Singles Chart.

Here I Stand received generally positive reviews from music critics, who viewed it as a sign of growth and maturity from Usher, although others were unimpressed by the change in style from his 2004 album Confessions. It debuted atop the Billboard 200, and sold 433,000 copies in the US in its first week of release, and as of 2010, has sold 1.3 million copies in that country. The album also reached number one on the Canadian Albums Chart, UK Albums Chart and Australian Albums Chart.

Although it had sold two million copies by August 2008, Here I Stand was seen as a commercial failure relative to Confessions, which had sold fifteen million copies. Tyler Lewis of PopMatters put the album's limited success down to Usher's and Foster's marriage; he believed that Usher's fans disliked Foster.

Background
In 2004, Usher's fourth studio album, Confessions was released, becoming the most-shipped album of the year in the United States. Before the album's release, he broke up with his girlfriend Chilli. In December 2005, he became romantically involved with stylist Tameka Foster; the two wed on August 3, 2007, although Usher's mother and manager, Jonnetta Patton, did not attend. Foster gave birth to Usher Raymond V later that year.
In May 2007, Usher split with Patton as his manager. This prompted "gossip" that Usher had "fired" her because of his growing relationship with Foster. He denied the claims, saying, "I love my mother ... I decided not to fire, not get rid of, but to give [my mother] the ultimate compliment—to retire her to be a full-time grandmother." He continued by stating that the split was a mutual decision. It was speculated that Patton's dismissal was due to his engagement with Foster; Usher dismissed these claims on Total Request Live (TRL) in May 2008. In what MTV News' Shawn Adler called an "angry tirade", Usher stated, "My wife had nothing to do with me firing my mother — nothing like that, that's trash. I hear y'all talking crazy out there. She's a beautiful black woman. Stop. Stop talking. And I love her. Stop it." The outbreak was compared to Mariah Carey's unannounced 2001 appearance on TRL, when she handed out popsicles to the show's audience and performed a "striptease", while some fans noted Usher's speech as evidence that Foster was being controlling of Usher. Usher hired Benny Medina as his new manager; Medina said of Usher, "The thing that excited me most is the intense commitment to his art, his incredible professionalism and the fact that I feel as though he's just hitting a stride."

In January 2008, Usher's father, Usher Raymond III, died. Both men regretted not spending more time in each other's lives. "Prayer for You", the seventh track on Here I Stand, is an interlude dedicated to Usher's son, reflective on his relationship with his own father; "No matter what happened, my father always prayed for me. The only difference is, I'm gonna be there to be the father that my dad wished he was to me." The first album name that artists and repertoire representative Mark Pitts conceived was "Measure of a Man", but that title had already been used by Clay Aiken for his debut album, so Usher called it Here I Stand. Pitts said, "It was perfect because becoming a man is about going through pain, sorrow, and happiness. Usher's done that! From the love songs to the party joints, it's exactly the story he wanted to tell." Usher noted Here I Stand as beginning "a new chapter in my life"; the album's liner notes contain a verse from 1 Corinthians 13: "When I was a child, I spoke as a child, I understood as a child, I thought as a child: but when I became a man, I put away childish things." Here I Stand marked Usher's growth from boyhood to manhood. In March 2007, it was announced that work on the album had begun. Usher outlined the album's concept: "A lot of what I plan to offer with this album is kinda standing in this spot ... The king's back. I ain't gonna say 'back,' I never left."

The Rich Harrison-produced track, titled "Dat Girl Right There", was leaked on November 11, 2007. The song charted on the Billboard Hot R&B/Hip-Hop Songs at number 74, due to high airplay. Featuring Ludacris—with whom Usher collaborated on "Yeah!" in 2004—the song was originally thought to be the lead single from Here I Stand; however it was not included on the record. Other potential tracks cited before the album's release were "All the Time" (produced by T-Pain) and "The Realest" (produced by Jermaine Dupri), although neither was included on the album. Here I Stand contains eighteen tracks; James "JLack" Lackey, Polow da Don, Tricky Stewart, Jazze Pha, The-Dream, Los da Mystro, will.i.am, Dupri, Manuel Seal, LRoc, Dre & Vidal, Bryan-Michael Cox, Stargate, Ne-Yo, Danja, Soundz and J. R. Rotem all produced tunes on the album. On the iTunes Store deluxe edition, "Revolver" was included, which was produced by Alexander "Prettyboifresh" Parhm.

Composition

Here I Stand is an R&B album, Josh Eells of Blender summed up much of the production of the album as "cocktail-lounge crunk, full of splashy cymbals, jazzy electric guitar and tinkly pianos". Many of its themes were inspired by Foster and Raymond V, resulting in a great number of ballads. Here I Stand opens with an "Intro" (titled "Forever Young" on some copies), while the lead single "Love in This Club" follows, on which Young Jeezy appears. The mid-tempo song features a shuddering synth beat and speaks of a lusting desire in a nightclub. "This Ain't Sex" is a disco-influenced song that "speaks of sex as a privileged act between two consenting adults". "Trading Places" uses guitar instrumentation to host role reversal in both sexual and non-sexual situations in a relationship. "Moving Mountains" is a ballad that draws on synth beats to relate a love struggle to an impossible task, such as moving mountains. The album's sixth track is "What's Your Name", an electro song which features new wave-influenced synths produced by will.i.am, who also contributes vocals to the song. The "Prayer for You" interlude follows, an ode to Usher's son in which Raymond V cries. Usher prays for his son to be "better than me".
"Something Special" is a pop ballad that begins acoustically, and was inspired by Robin Thicke and John Mayer because of its honesty. Usher discussed the song: "It's about the feeling when you're in real love. It could be about my son or my wife."

According to Usher "Love You Gently", a piano-based classic rhythm and blues ballad, is "the one [track] you throw on with your significant other when it's time to get to it. This is why my son's here. It's a baby-maker." Jay-Z appears on the horn-founded "Best Thing", which is about transition to manhood. Usher outlines lifestyle changes since his wife's arrival and turns away from his days as "a hustler and a player" in "Before I Met You", which makes use of guitar and heavy drums. He is suspected of infidelity and compared to his girlfriend's cheating ex-partner on "His Mistakes". The thirteenth track on Here I Stand is "Appetite", which utilizes flutes and has Usher tempted to cheat on his wife. "What's a Man to Do" opens with a Native American call, while "Lifetime" contains influences of 1990s R&B. "Love in This Club Part II" features vocals from Beyoncé Knowles and Lil Wayne and samples The Stylistics' "You Are Everything" (1971); its lyrical content is similar to that of Part I, and Wayne's voice is modified through the use of a vocoder. The album's soul and pop jazz-derived title track, "Here I Stand", drew comparisons to Stevie Wonder. With a theme of commitment, it was played at Usher's and Foster's wedding. Here I Stand closes with "Will Work for Love", although it was placed as a hidden track on some copies; Sal Cinquemani from Slant Magazine called it "cute".

Release
In November 2007, Usher hoped to release his fifth album, titled Here I Stand, but "issues in his personal life" delayed the album. According to reports, Usher has to spend more time with his then-pregnant wife. The expected November release date was booked to coincide with that of Usher's fragrance line. Released on May 13, 2008. The continually changing release dates became frustrating for Usher; Dupri said to Billboard, "The last couple [of] times I've been around [Usher], you could tell he's got the bug to hurry up and put this record out. He wants to get back out here and give the people that. He's got that itch." Here I Stand was first released by LaFace Records in Mexico and several European countries on May 13, 2008; releases in other countries followed.

Promotion

In 2008, Usher promoted Here I Stand by appearing at Radio 1's Big Weekend, where he performed "This Ain't Sex", "Moving Mountains", "What's Your Name", "Here I Stand" and "Love in This Club", as well as singles from his previous albums.
Usher performed "Love in This Club" with Young Jeezy on The Hills third season finale (May 12, 2008), and along with "This Ain't Sex" on Saturday Night Live (May 17, 2008), and again on the sixth season finale of Dancing with the Stars (May 20, 2008). Usher performed a one-off showcase concert for 1,500 fans at indigO2, London on May 22, 2008, for which the tickets were allocated by ballot. Usher signed copies of Here I Stand for the military during Fleet Week in New York City, aboard USS Kearsarge on May 27, 2008. On the day of the album's release, Usher appeared on television shows TRL and 106 & Park, and performed on Good Morning America on May 30, 2008. Usher performed "Love in This Club" on The Tonight Show with Jay Leno and Jimmy Kimmel Live!, on June 4, 2008. At the BET Awards, hosted on June 23, 2008, Usher opened the show, performing the single again. On September 4, 2008, Usher performed "Here I Stand", "Trading Places" and "What's Your Name" at the 2008's National Football League Kickoff game at Columbus Circle, New York City. Natasha Bedingfield and Keith Urban also sang before the game, which saw the Washington Redskins play the New York Giants.

Tour

The One Night Stand: Ladies Only''' is the third concert tour by American recording artist Usher. The tour promotes Raymond's fifth studio album, Here I Stand (2008).

Background
Usher toured fourteen cities in North America. Mainly targeting women, the tour commenced on November 2, 2008 and concluded on November 25, 2008. The tour's female-focused concept was inspired by other male recording artists who "did things special like this for their female fans", such as Teddy Pendergrass, Marvin Gaye and Prince. Enjoying the challenge of a female-only tour, Usher said, "There [are] only a few artists that can pull that off, I feel like I've had such a connection with my audience. This album, I felt like, was definitely the type of one that was more intimate. So what better way to get up close and personal than to make it all women?" Usher performed the tour with a Dsquared2 wardrobe. At each show, one fan was brought onstage "for an even more intimate experience with the singer". This took place during "Superstar"; a female fan was served champagne and strawberries by Usher while sitting on his lap as he sang to her. Among Usher's own songs, the setlist also included portions of Stevie Wonder's "Rocket Love", Gaye's "I Want You" and Prince's "Do Me, Baby". At the Detroit show he also gave T-Baby's "It's So Cold in the D". Usher was supported by a five-piece band, three backing vocalists and four backup dancers.

Setlist
The following setlist was obtained from the concert held on November 3, 2008, at the Hammerstein Ballroom in New York City, New York. It does not necessarily represent all concerts for the duration of the tour. 
"Forever Young"
"Love in this Club"
"Follow Me"
"U Remind Me"
"This Ain't Sex"
"That's What It's Made For"
"U Got It Bad"
"Trading Places"
"Do Me, Baby"/"Adore"
"Seduction"
"Nice & Slow"
"Dot Com"
"Rocket Love"
"Superstar"
"Bad Girl"
"You Make Me Wanna..."
"I Don't Know"
"I Want You"
"Confessions Part II"
"Medley" ("My Boo"/"Back in the Day"/"Think of You"/"I Need a Girl"/"Can U Get Wit It"/"Lovers & Friends")
"That's What It's Made For"
"Yeah!"
"Here I Stand"
Encore
"Caught Up"

Tour dates

Reception
Sun Media's Jason MacNeil rated the Toronto show three-and-a-half stars out of five, praising Usher's connection with the female audience. Lee Hildebrand of the San Francisco Chronicle commended Usher's live vocal ability.
Parimal M. Rohit from Buzzine stated in his positive review of the Los Angeles show that "everyone will be talking about the entertaining concert".

Singles
Five singles were released from Here I Stand. "Love in This Club" was leaked in early 2008 by its producer, Polow da Don, prior to its release on February 22, 2008. The song topped the US Billboard Hot 100, the Hot R&B/Hip-Hop Songs and the New Zealand Singles Chart, while reaching the top ten of numerous other record charts. It was certified platinum in the United States and New Zealand. A sequel was created, titled "Love in This Club Part II" with Beyoncé & Lil Wayne, and was sent to radio as the album's second single on April 28, 2008. While it did not have the commercial success of the original, it emerged on the Hot 100, the Hot R&B/Hip-Hop Songs, the Canadian Hot 100, and the ARIA Singles Chart, and received a gold certification from the RIAA.

"Moving Mountains" was released on May 23, 2008. It appeared on multiple singles charts outside the top twenty. However, it peaked at number six on the New Zealand Singles Chart, and was certified gold by the Recording Industry Association of New Zealand on March 29, 2009. The fourth single to be released from Here I Stand was "What's Your Name"; it impacted radio on August 18, 2008. "What's Your Name" charted on the Canadian Hot 100 and the ARIA Singles Chart, where it peaked at numbers eighty-four and ninety-one, respectively. "Here I Stand" was released to urban adult contemporary radio on August 18, 2008, managing to peak at number 18 on the Hot R&B/Hip-Hop Songs chart. The album's final single, "Trading Places", was released on October 17, 2008 and reached number forty-five on the Hot 100 and number four on the Hot R&B/Hip-Hop Songs.

Critical receptionHere I Stand received generally positive reviews from music critics. At Metacritic, which assigns a weighted mean rating out of 100 to reviews from mainstream critics, the album received a score of 65 out of 100, based on fifteen reviews. Mark Edward Nero of About.com gave the album four out of five stars, and wrote that Usher's marriage had a positive effect on his music. He called Here I Stand "as good - if not better" than Confessions. IGN critic Chad Grischow wrote that "Growing up may have taken toll on Usher's personal life, but it has not altered the man's ability to create refreshing music"; Grischow rated the album 8.1 out of 10. USA Today praised the maturity of Usher's lyrics on Here I Stand, while The A.V. Club Joshua Alston commended the album's ballads. Although she disliked the album's length and lyrics, Entertainment Weekly Leah Greenblatt wrote that "a good portion of [Here I] Stand tunes deserve a place in the dance-floor pantheon", and awarded it a B+ grade. Andy Kellman from Allmusic scored the record three-and-a-half stars out of five and stated that "the album leaves no doubt that the R&B male crown ... should not change hands", referring to Usher's King of R&B honorific nickname. Richard Cromelin of the Los Angeles Times did not appreciate the numerous ballads on the release, but compared it to Usher's previous work and declared, "it's a more accomplished version of Confessions, the hooks more effortless, the singing even better, the songwriting more consistent." Jim DeRogatis from the Chicago Sun-Times viewed it as proof that Usher has claimed the 'King of R&B' title from R. Kelly.

However, Dan Gennoe of Yahoo! Music felt that the album lacked inspiration, and wrote, "nothing sticks, there's no guts, no depth and no matter how much he protests to the contrary, nothing to believe". Rolling Stone Melissa Maerz perceived that Usher had put little effort into the record and stated that "now that he's got the American Dream, he sounds like he's stopped trying." Blender Josh Eells was let down by the large number of ballads and lack of sexual content. Clover Hope of The Village Voice described it as "pure grown-man bidness" and "a little too sitting-on-the-dock-of-the-bay for Chris Breezy–trained earbuds". Sal Cinquemani from Slant Magazine scored Here I Stand two-and-a-half stars out of five, and considered the music "almost always just one notch above mediocrity." The Observer Steve Yates panned the album as "gloop [Usher] wades through". In his consumer guide for MSN Music, critic Robert Christgau cited the songs "Trading Places" and "Best Thing" as "choice cuts", indicating "good song[s] on an album that isn't worth your time or money". Jon Pareles of The New York Times wrote that "tension, not bliss, creates the album's best songs", referring to "Moving Mountains", "His Mistakes", "Appetite" and "What's a Man To Do". At the 51st Grammy Awards, the album's title track was nominated for the Best Male R&B Vocal Performance award, but lost to Ne-Yo's "Miss Independent" from his 2008 album, Year of the Gentleman.

Commercial performanceHere I Stand had unweighted first-day sales of 146,000 in the US, and in its first three days of release sold an unweighted 267,000 units.
The album debuted at number one on the Billboard 200 chart. Selling 433,000 copies domestically in its first week of release, it was the second highest selling US debut of the year at the time, behind Mariah Carey's E=MC2. In its second week of release, it sold 145,000 copies and dropped to number three on the Billboard 200. As at May 2012 it had sold 1,308,000 copies in the United States, and it has received a platinum certification from the Recording Industry Association of America (RIAA). Here I Stand also debuted atop the Canadian Albums Chart, and spent eight weeks on the chart.

On the UK Albums Chart, Here I Stand debuted at number one on the chart of June 7, 2008, selling 56,897 copies. It was certified gold by the British Phonographic Industry (BPI), and lasted seventeen weeks in the chart before dropping out. The album peaked at number two on the Irish Albums Chart, remaining for fifteen weeks in the chart and was awarded a gold certification from the Irish Recorded Music Association (IRMA). In mainland Europe, the album was received well; it appeared at number three on the European Top 100 Albums, and reached the top ten in the Belgian Ultratop charts of both Flanders and Wallonia, as well as in the album charts of France, Germany, the Netherlands and Switzerland. In Oceania, Here I Stand attained a number-one position on the Australian Albums Chart and reached number five on the New Zealand Albums Chart. It received a gold certification from the Australian Recording Industry Association (ARIA), denoting shipments of 35,000 copies in the country.

Impact
Usher's publicist, Patti Webster, resigned on August 1, 2008. Usher rehired Patton as his manager on August 6, 2008 and "dissolved his management arrangement with Benny Medina". At the time of the split from Medina, Here I Stand had sold two million copies worldwide compared to Confessions fifteen million copies; some speculated that the disunion was because of the poorer album sales. Medina said that he and the singer "parted ways amicably", and deflected comments that he was responsible for the lower album sales. He pointed out that Here I Stand and "Love in This Club" reached number one on the US charts, and that the music industry had changed since the release of Confessions. Due to the lower sales, Here I Stand was seen as a commercial failure. According to Tyler Lewis from PopMatters its failure was spurred by Usher's marriage to Foster: "his fanbase hated his wife".

Usher filed for divorce from Foster in June 2009, stating that their marriage was "irretrievably broken". "Papers", the first single from Usher's next album Raymond v. Raymond (2010), discussed the divorce process, although it was recorded before the couple split.

Track listingNotes'"Love in This Club Part II" contains a portion of the composition "You Are Everything", written by Thomas Bell and Linda Creed.
 signifies a co-producer.
 signifies a vocal producer.
 signifies an additional producer.

Personnel
Credits for Here I Stand'' adapted from Allmusic.

 The Ambassadors – keyboards
 Marcella "Ms. Lago" Araica – mixing
 Chris Athens – mastering
 Johntá Austin – vocal production
 Tim Blacksmith – management
 Adam Blackstone – music
 B.M.C. – bass, strings, drums, keyboards, programming, editing
 G. Preston Boebel – engineering
 Kobie Brown – music clearance
 Míguel Bustamante – mixing assistance
 Candice Childress – production coordination
 Brian Michael Cox – arrangement, production
 Danny D – management
 Vidal Davis – production, instrumentation
 Vincent Dilorenzo – engineering, mixing
 Dylan Dresdow – mixing
 Assa Drori – violin
 Jermaine Dupri – production, mixing
 Mattias Eng – music clearance
 Mikkel S. Eriksen – engineering, instrumentation, grand piano
 Donald Ferrone – double bass
 Brent Fischer – conductor, string arrangements
 Clare Fischer – string arrangements
 Armen Garabedian – principal
 Brian Gately – production coordination
 Serban Ghenea – mixing
 Mark Gray – engineering assistant
 Ryan Greene – engineering
 Donato Guadagnoli – music clearance
 John Hanes – digital editing
 Kuk Harrell – production, engineering, vocal production
 Andre Harris – production, instrumentation
 Vahe Hayrikyan – cello
 Karl Heilbron – guitar, engineering
 Tor Erik Hermansen – instrumentation
 Chris Hicks – author, management
 Leticia Hilliard – artist coordination
 Ray Holton – guitar
 John Horesco IV – engineering
 Josh Houghkirk – mixing assistance, assistance
 Dave Hyman – engineering
 Jay-Z – vocals
 Jazze Pha – production
 Padraic Kerin – engineering
 Beyoncé Knowles – vocals

 James Lackey – production
 Lyah Beth LeFlore – liner notes
 Lil Wayne – vocals
 Espen Lind – guitar
 Craig Love – guitar, production
 Manny Marroquin – mixing
 Derrick "Young World" McAlister – keyboards
 Carlos "Los Da Mystro" McKinney – production
 Benny Medina – author, management
 Tadd Mingo – engineering assistance
 Scott Naughton – engineering
 Ne-Yo – production
 Alec Newell – engineering
 Greg Ogan – engineering
 Carlos Oyanedel – mixing assistance
 Anthony Palazzole – mixing assistance
 Joe Peluso – engineering assistance, mixing assistance
 Dave Pensado – mixing
 Kazi Pitelka – viola
 Mark Pitts – executive production, author, A&R
 Christian Plata – mixing assistance
 Polow da Don – production, instrumentation
 Tameka Raymond – stylist
 Usher – vocals, executive production
 Geoff Rice – engineering assistance
 Tim Roberts – Pro-Tools
 J.R. Rotem – arrangement, production, instrumentation
 Norman Jean Roy – photography
 Brian Schunck – mixing assistance
 Manuel Seal – guitar, production
 Harry Shirinian – viola
 Cory Shoemaker – engineering assistance
 S.O.S. Horn Players – horn
 Soundz – production
 Brian Springer – engineering
 Brian Stanley – engineering, mixing
 Christopher "Tricky" Stewart – production
 Phil Tan – mixing
 Tony Terrebonne – engineering
 Sam Thomas – engineering
 Pat Thrall – engineering
 Andrew Weupper – mixing assistance
 will.i.am – synthesizer, production, engineering, Fender Rhodes, drum programming, vocals
 Corey Williams – engineering
 Andrew Wuepper – mixing assistance
 Young Jeezy – vocals

Charts

Weekly charts

Year-end charts

Certifications and sales

Release history

See also
 List of number-one albums of 2008 (Australia)
 List of number-one albums of 2008 (Canada)
 List of UK Albums Chart number ones of the 2000s
 List of number-one albums of 2008 (U.S.)
 List of number-one R&B albums of 2008 (U.S.)

References

2008 albums
Albums produced by Bryan-Michael Cox
Albums produced by Danja (record producer)
Albums produced by Dre & Vidal
Albums produced by J. R. Rotem
Albums produced by Jazze Pha
Albums produced by Jermaine Dupri
Albums produced by Polow da Don
Albums produced by Stargate
Albums produced by Ne-Yo
Albums produced by Tricky Stewart
Albums produced by will.i.am
LaFace Records albums
Usher (musician) albums
Albums produced by Kuk Harrell